The Constant Nymph is a 1924 novel by Margaret Kennedy. It tells how a teenage girl falls in love with a family friend, who eventually marries her cousin. It explores the protagonists' complex family histories, focusing on class, education and creativity.

Success
The novel sold well from its first appearance, becoming the first novel of a genre sometimes called "Bohemian". Much of its success was due to its then-shocking sexual content, describing scenes of adolescent sexuality and of noble savagery in the Austrian Tyrol.

There is a complimentary allusion to the novel in the 1934 detective story The Nine Tailors by Dorothy L. Sayers. Fifteen-year-old Hilary tells her father she aspires to write novels: "Best sellers. The sort that everybody goes potty over. Not just bosh ones, but like The Constant Nymph." Sayers includes a positive mention by two characters in her 1930 epistolary novel, The Documents in the Case.

Adaptations

Margaret Kennedy and Basil Dean adapted The Constant Nymph for a three-act play that was published by Doubleday, Page and Company (Garden City, N.Y.) in 1926. A differently treated, second stage adaptation of the play was published by William Heinemann (London) in 1926. The play was performed on the London stage in 1926 and featured Noël Coward and Edna Best.

The novel was first adapted as a silent film in 1928 by Adrian Brunel and Alma Reville and directed by Brunel and Basil Dean. This version starred Ivor Novello, Mabel Poulton and Benita Hume. It was adapted again in 1933 by Dorothy Farnum and directed by Dean. It featured Victoria Hopper, Brian Aherne and Leonora Corbett. A third film adaptation in 1943 featured Charles Boyer, Joan Fontaine, and Alexis Smith. It was adapted by Kathryn Scola and directed by Edmund Goulding.

References

External links
Full text of The Constant Nymph at the Internet Archive

1924 British novels
British novels adapted into films
British plays
Heinemann (publisher) books
Novels by Margaret Kennedy
Novels set in Austria